WXMI (channel 17) is a television station licensed to Grand Rapids, Michigan, United States, serving West Michigan as an affiliate of the Fox network. Owned by the E. W. Scripps Company, the station maintains studios on Plaza Drive (near M-37) on the northern side of Grand Rapids, and its transmitter is located southwest of Middleville.

History

The station signed on the air on March 18, 1982, as an independent station under the call sign WWMA, standing for "West Michigan's Alternative" (as it was the first locally based independent station in the market not associated with a religious organization). The station was founded and originally owned by Heritage Broadcasting Company. Approximately a year after signing on, additional shareholders bought control of the station and changed the call sign to the current WXMI on August 15, 1983. In 1987, WXMI signed an affiliation deal to become the market's Fox affiliate; it joined the network on April 9, 1987, when Fox expanded its programming offerings to include prime time programming. In 1989, the station's stock was purchased by a New York-based company headed by Robert Dudley called Odyssey Television Partners.

Nine years later, WXMI was purchased by Indianapolis-based Emmis Communications, which traded the station with sister KTZZ in Seattle to Tribune Broadcasting in 1998 in exchange for FM station WQCD in New York City.

Aborted acquisition by Sinclair Broadcast Group and resale to Standard Media Group
On May 8, 2017, Hunt Valley, Maryland-based Sinclair Broadcast Group entered into an agreement to acquire Tribune Media for $3.9 billion, plus the assumption of $2.7 billion in debt held by Tribune. Sinclair was precluded from acquiring WXMI directly, as it already owned CBS affiliate WWMT (channel 3). On April 24, 2018, Sinclair announced that it would sell WXMI and eight other stations – Sinclair-operated KOKH-TV in Oklahoma City, WRLH-TV in Richmond, KDSM-TV in Des Moines, WOLF-TV (along with LMA partners WSWB and WQMY) in Scranton–Wilkes-Barre and WXLV-TV in Greensboro/Winston-Salem–High Point, and Tribune-owned WPMT in York, Pennsylvania – to Standard Media Group (an independent broadcast holding company formed by private equity firm Standard General to assume ownership of and absolve ownership conflicts involving the aforementioned stations) for $441.1 million.

Tribune terminated the Sinclair deal on August 9, 2018, and filed a breach of contract lawsuit, three weeks after the FCC's July 18 vote to have the deal reviewed by an administrative law judge amid "serious concerns" about Sinclair's forthrightness in its applications to sell certain conflict properties; the sale to Standard Media was also cancelled, as it was predicated on the closure of the Sinclair–Tribune merger.

Sale to Scripps
On December 3, 2018, Irving, Texas-based Nexstar Media Group announced it would acquire the assets of Tribune Media for $6.4 billion in cash and debt. Nexstar was precluded from acquiring WXMI directly or indirectly, as it already owned NBC affiliate WOOD-TV (channel 8), MyNetworkTV affiliate WXSP-CD (channel 15), and Battle Creek–based ABC affiliate WOTV (channel 41). On March 20, 2019, the Cincinnati-based E. W. Scripps Company announced it would purchase WXMI from Nexstar upon consummation of the merger, as part of the company's sale of nineteen Nexstar- and Tribune-operated stations to Scripps and Tegna Inc. in separate deals worth $1.32 billion; the sale was completed on September 19, 2019.

Programming
Syndicated programming on WXMI (as of September 2020) includes The Drew Barrymore Show, The Steve Wilkos Show,  Daily Mail TV, Dateline, Modern Family, and Right This Minute among others. WXMI is an affiliate of the Detroit Lions Television Network, which airs pre-season games as well as the weekly syndicated show The Ford Lions Report during the regular season. Since it is outside of the team's local blackout area, it also airs all regular season games produced by Fox.

News operation
WXMI presently broadcasts 68½ hours of locally produced newscasts each week (with 11½ hours each weekday and 5½ hours each on Saturdays and Sundays).  In regards to the number of hours devoted to news programming, it is the highest local newscast output of any television station in the Grand Rapids market.

On January 11, 1999, WXMI started its news department and launched the market's first prime time newscast at 10:00 p.m. It originally aired for 35 minutes on weeknights and for a half-hour on weekends. The program would expand to a full hour seven nights a week in 2004. On August 28, 2006, the station premiered the Fox 17 Morning News. Originally a two-hour-long broadcast, it expanded to four hours (running from 5:00 to 9:00 a.m.) on September 15, 2008. On April 17, 2009, WXMI became the first station in West Michigan to begin broadcasting its local newscasts in high definition; at the time, WOOD-TV and ABC affiliates WZZM (channel 13) and WOTV produced their newscasts in merely widescreen enhanced-definition (WWMT became the second station in the market to upgrade to HD newscasts on April 16, 2011, followed by WOOD-TV/WOTV on October 22, 2011, and finally, by WZZM on December 3, 2011). On April 20, 2011, during the weekday morning show, the station officially unveiled a new logo, graphics, music package ("The Unexpected" by 615 Music), and set.

On September 21, 2009, WXMI debuted an hour-long newscast at 6 p.m. that competes against half-hour newscasts on WWMT, WOOD-TV, and WZZM and their national network evening newscasts. On March 7, 2011, the station debuted an hour-long lifestyle program at weeknights 5 p.m. called The One Seven; the final broadcast of the program aired only five months later on August 19, 2011. It was hosted by Michele DeSelms and Tim Doty and featured lifestyle segments, art, entertainment stories, cooking segments and some local news. The program was replaced by a traditional hour-long local newscast at 5:00 p.m. (which debuted without any promotion) on August 22, 2011. On March 2, 2013, WXMI debuted weekend morning newscasts, running for four hours from 5:00 to 9:00 a.m. on Saturdays and Sundays. The station added a nightly 11 p.m. newscast on June 2, 2014; a promo for the new newscast references the shift from the common Fox affiliate news tagline of "at 10 (o'clock) it's news, at 11 (o'clock) it's history," with the additional wording "we changed our mind." A 4 p.m. newscast debuted on September 8, 2014.

Notable former on-air staff
 Ahmed Fareed, sports anchor (2002-2003) — now studio host/reporter at NBCSN

Technical information

Subchannels
The station's digital signal is multiplexed:

From August 2006 to September 2007, The Tube aired on the station's second digital subchannel. In July 2010, the station reactivated its second digital subchannel to carry This TV, which moved to a new third subchannel on December 9 in anticipation of the December 31 launch of Antenna TV. In October 2019, WXMI-DT3 switched to Court TV (a network owned by Scripps sister company Katz Broadcasting), though it was a move planned by Tribune even before WXMI's sale to Scripps.

Analog-to-digital conversion
WXMI shut down its analog signal, over UHF channel 17, on June 12, 2009, as part of the federally mandated transition from analog to digital television. The station's digital signal remained on its pre-transition UHF channel 19, using PSIP to display WXMI's virtual channel as 17 on digital television receivers.

Translators
In addition to its main signal, the station also operates two translators, mainly to provide clear service of the station to lakeshore cities with varying terrain blocking reception of the main signal, and to address interference in farther portions of the market by former sister station WGN-TV from Chicago, which also broadcasts its digital signal on UHF channel 19. Two additional transmitters in the southern part of the market, officially classed as WXMI digital repeaters, serve the direct Kalamazoo area on channel 30 from the tower of WGVU-TV's Kalamazoo satellite WGVK, along with a second repeater licensed to Battle Creek on channel 17 transmitting from the city's south side; all four translators carry WXMI and its subchannel services, and all map via PSIP to channel 17. As of 2021, WXSP-CD also carries 17.1 in the ATSC 3.0 format. This means it is possible for a television or receiver in the Grand Rapids market receiving an over-the-air signal to map out up to six different WXMI signals in its channel map.

W42CB channel 42 completed a flash-cut to digital-only broadcasting in November 2010. W52DB on analog channel 52 was replaced by a digital signal on channel 17 in December 2010. In late June 2011, W52DB calls became W17DF-D. In mid-March, 2019, W17DF-D moved from channel 17 to channel 18.

References

WXMI TV Channel 17 (June 13, 2005). Michigan's Radio and TV Broadcast Guide.
WXMI.com |About The Station (June 7, 2006).
WXMI.com | WXMI News Staff (March 18, 2007).
Mlive.com | Calderon, Justice go West (August 12, 2007).
WXMI announces 6PM newscast to debut in September 2009

External links
Official website

Fox network affiliates
Bounce TV affiliates
TrueReal affiliates
Antenna TV affiliates
E. W. Scripps Company television stations
Television channels and stations established in 1982
Barry County, Michigan
XMI
Low-power television stations in the United States
1982 establishments in Michigan